Acinia reticulata is a species of tephritid or fruit flies in the genus Acinia of the family Tephritidae.

Distribution
Peru.

References

Tephritinae
Insects described in 1958
Diptera of South America